Magdalena de Kino is a city, part of the surrounding municipality of the same name, located in the Mexican state of Sonora covering approximately 560 square miles (1,460 square kilometers). According to the 2005 census, the city's population was 23,101, and the municipality's population was 25,500. Magdalena de Kino is in the northern section of Sonora 50 miles (80 kilometers) from the Mexico-U.S. border. To the north the municipality abuts Nogales; to the south, the municipality of Santa Ana; to the east, Ímuris and Cucurpe; and to the west, the municipalities of Tubutama and Sáric. Its main sectors include San Ignacio, San Isidro, Tacicuri, and Sásabe. The city was named after the pioneer Roman Catholic missionary and explorer, Father Eusebio Francisco Kino, who worked in the area, as well as in the present-day US state of Arizona.

History
Originally, the territory was populated by the Papagos (Tohono O'odham) and Pimas (Akimel O'odham). The first missions were established in 1687, with the arrival of Father Eusebio Francisco Kino. The municipal seat was founded at the beginning of 18th century by Lieutenant Juan Bautista Escalante. Magdalena de Kino suffered two massacres, one in 1757 and another in 1776. The city was founded by decree in December, 1923. At first the city was called "Santa María Magdalena de Buquivaba", but was changed in 1966 to its present name.

Economy
Agriculture is a key economic activity throughout the municipality. Crops include fruit, wheat, maize, common bean and sorghum. Cattle ranching is also an important source of income within the municipality.

Industry  employs approximately 2,000 individuals, primarily at the various maquiladoras. In addition, the city's businesses produce beverages, construction and furniture.

Primary tourist attractions
Magdalena de Kino has 6 hotels and 6 bars/restaurants and several sites of interest to tourists, including:
The Temple of Santa María Magdalena, with an image of San Francisco Xavier, an important historical figure for both Sonora and the neighboring U.S. state of Arizona.
The Grave of Father Kino, who died in the year 1711 and is interred in a crypt near the mission he founded. The monument was constructed in 1966 after the discovery of Father Kino's remains.
The Father Kino Museum, with architectural designs by Marco Antonio Ortez, where objects of the indigenous cultures of the region are exhibited, including photographs, weaponry and clothing.
The Mausoleum of Luis Donaldo Colosio Murrieta and wife Diana Laura Riojas de Colosio, located in the municipal pantheon.
Numerous buildings constructed of stone with engravings reflecting the history of the municipality and Mexico in general.

Notable residents
Magdalena de Kino is the birthplace of presidential candidate Luis Donaldo Colosio, a member of the PRI movement, and who was assassinated in Tijuana in 1994.

Magdalena de Kino is the birthplace of soccer player Alejandro Gallardo World Cup winner in Peru U-17 in 2005. Currently plays in F.C. Atlas

Magdalena de Kino is the birthplace of Daniel Contreras, owner of three "El Guero Canelo" restaurants in Tucson, Arizona. They are especially noted for their Sonoran hot dogs. He and his restaurants (which originated as one food truck) have been featured on Food Network TV shows. Contreras also has a bakery and tortilla factory in Magdalena de Kino, which supply his restaurants.

Magdalena de Kino is the birthplace of brothers Luis and Ramón Urías, professional baseball players who have played in the MLB.

References in popular culture

Magdalena de Kino is the subject of a song by The Killers frontman, Brandon Flowers. 'Magdalena' appears on his solo album Flamingo.

Magdalena de Kino was also a filming site for Fast and The Furious.

International relations

Twin towns – Sister cities
Magdalena de Kino is twinned with:
 Guadalajara, Mexico
 Temple City, California
 Sahuarita, Arizona

Notes

References
Link to tables of population data from Census of 2005 INEGI: Instituto Nacional de Estadística, Geografía e Informática
Sonora Enciclopedia de los Municipios de México

External links

 Official website of Magdalena de Kino, Sonora
 Tourism commission of Sonora — About Magdalena de Kino
 Mission Santa Maria Magdalena — and Padre Kino's tomb.

Populated places in Sonora
Populated places in the Sonoran Desert of Mexico
Pueblos Mágicos
Populated places established in 1687